San Andrés Duraznal is a town and one of the 119 Municipalities of Chiapas, in southern Mexico.

As of 2010, the municipality had a total population of 4,545, up from 3,423 as of 2005. It covers an area of 29.9 km².

As of 2010, the town of San Andrés Duraznal had a population of 2,987. Other than the town of San Andrés Duraznal, the municipality had 12 localities, none of which had a population over 1,000.

References

Municipalities of Chiapas